ATN Times Now is a Canadian Category B English language specialty channel owned by Asian Television Network (ATN). It broadcasts programming from Times Now and Canadian content. It features live coverage of news stories with a focus on international news and breaking news.

See also 
 ATN NDTV 24x7

External links 
 
 Times Now

24-hour television news channels in Canada
Television channels and stations established in 2011
Digital cable television networks in Canada
South Asian television in Canada